Sabrina Inés Flores Grigoriu (born 31 January 1996) is an American-born Mexican footballer who plays as a defender for NJ/NY Gotham FC in the National Women's Soccer League (NWSL). She has played for the Mexico national team.

Personal life
Born in Livingston, New Jersey to a Mexican father and a Romanian mother, Flores graduated from Livingston High School. Sabrina and her twin sister, Monica Flores, both attended and played for Notre Dame.

While representing United States U-20, she faced her twin sister, who represented Mexico U-20, at the 2015 CONCACAF Women's U-20 Championship and the 2016 FIFA U-20 Women's World Cup. Her brother, Alex Flores, studies medicine at Wayne State University School of Medicine.

References

External links

1996 births
Living people
Citizens of Mexico through descent
Mexican women's footballers
Women's association football midfielders
Women's association football defenders
Sevilla FC (women) players
Primera División (women) players
Mexican people of Romanian descent
Mexican expatriate women's footballers
Mexican expatriate sportspeople in Spain
Expatriate women's footballers in Spain
Twin sportspeople
Mexican twins
People from Livingston, New Jersey
Sportspeople from Essex County, New Jersey
Soccer players from New Jersey
American women's soccer players
Livingston High School (New Jersey) alumni
Notre Dame Fighting Irish women's soccer players
NJ/NY Gotham FC draft picks
NJ/NY Gotham FC players
National Women's Soccer League players
United States women's under-20 international soccer players
American sportspeople of Mexican descent
American people of Romanian descent
American expatriate women's soccer players
American expatriate sportspeople in Spain
American twins